1309 Hyperborea is a carbonaceous background asteroid from the outermost regions of the asteroid belt, approximately 57 kilometers in diameter. It was discovered on 11 October 1931, by Soviet astronomer Grigory Neujmin at the Simeiz Observatory on the Crimean peninsula, and given the provisional designation . The asteroid was named after Hyperborea, the northern homeland of a Greek mythical race of giants.

Orbit and classification 

Hyperborea is a non-family asteroid of the main belt's background population. It orbits the Sun in the outermost asteroid belt at a distance of 2.7–3.7 AU once every 5 years and 9 months (2,098 days; semi-major axis of 3.21 AU). Its orbit has an eccentricity of 0.15 and an inclination of 10° with respect to the ecliptic.

Physical characteristics 

Hyperborea has been characterized as a carbonaceous C-type asteroid by Pan-STARRS photometric survey.

Rotation period 

Between 2002 and 2017, four rotational lightcurves of Hyperborea were obtained from photometric observations by astronomers Francisco Sold and Pierre Antonini, as well as by astronomers at the Oakley Southern Sky and Rozhen Observatory in Australia and Bulgaria, respectively. The consolidated lightcurve gave a rotation period of 13.88 hours with a brightness amplitude between 0.34 and 0.41 magnitude.

Diameter and albedo 

According to the surveys carried out by the Infrared Astronomical Satellite IRAS, the Japanese Akari satellite and the NEOWISE mission of NASA's Wide-field Infrared Survey Explorer, Hyperborea measures between 55.14 and 64.40 kilometers in diameter and its surface has an albedo between 0.03 and 0.0450.

The Collaborative Asteroid Lightcurve Link derives an albedo of 0.0411 and a diameter of 57.11 kilometers based on an absolute magnitude of 10.3.

Naming 

This minor planet was named after Hyperborea, the homeland of the Hyperboreans, a Greek mythical race of giants associated with the cult of Apollo. Herodotus placed the region far to the north of Thrace beyond the North Wind. It was therefore believed to be a region of perpetual sunshine. Lutz Schmadel, the author of the Dictionary of Minor Planets, learned about the naming from Russian astronomer Nataliya Sergeevna Samoilova-Yakhontova (see ).

References

External links 
 (1309) Hyperborea at AstDyS-2
 Asteroid Lightcurve Database (LCDB), query form (info )
 Dictionary of Minor Planet Names, Google books
 Asteroids and comets rotation curves, CdR – Observatoire de Genève, Raoul Behrend
 Discovery Circumstances: Numbered Minor Planets (1)-(5000) – Minor Planet Center
 
 

001309
Discoveries by Grigory Neujmin
Named minor planets
19311011
Hyperborea